Aram Shah (died in June 1211, r. 1210–1211) was the second Sultan of the Delhi Sultanate. He briefly held the throne from Lahore after the unexpected death of Qutb ud-Din Aibak before being defeated and dethroned by Iltutmish who began ruling from Delhi.

Origins 

Aram Shah is an obscure figure, and his relationship to his predecessor Qutb al-Din Aibak is not certain. In some manuscripts of Minhaj-i-Siraj's Tabaqat-i Nasiri, the words "bin Aibak" ("son of Aibak") appear after his name in a chapter heading, and later writers believed him to be a son of Aibak. However, the words "bin Aibak" in the headline may have been an erroneous addition made by a scribe. Minhaj-i-Siraj refers to only three daughters of Aibak elsewhere in the text, and Ata-Malik Juvayni's Tarikh-i Jahangushay explicitly states that Aibak did not have any son. What is known is that he succeeded Aibak in city of Lahore.

Reign 

In 1210, Qutb al-Din Aibak died unexpectedly in Lahore during a sport game, without having named a successor. To prevent instability in the kingdom, the Turkic nobles (maliks and amirs) in Lahore appointed Aram Shah as his successor at Lahore. However, the Turkic nobles in different parts of the Sultanate opposed his ascension, and some of them - such as the Khalji nobles of Bengal - rebelled against him. According to the 16th century historian Firishta, the kingdom also suffered an invasion from the neighbouring ruler Nasir ad-Din Qabacha of Multan.

A group of nobles, led by the military justiciar (Amir-i Dad) Ali-yi Ismail, invited Iltutmish to occupy the throne. Iltutmish, a former slave of Aibak and the governor of Badaun, had a distinguished record of service and was called a son by Aibak, because of which the nobles considered him as a good candidate for the throne. Iltutmish marched to Delhi, where he seized the power, and later defeated Aram Shah's forces at Bagh-i Jud. According to the Tabaqat-i Nasiri, Aram Shah was "martyred": it is not clear if he was killed on the battlefield, or put to death as a prisoner of war. Two of his important officers - Aqsanqar and Farrukh Shah - were killed on the battlefield. Iltutmish subsequently consolidated his power and began ruling from Delhi.

References

Bibliography 

 
 
 

Sultans of the Mamluk dynasty (Delhi)
13th-century Indian monarchs
Year of birth uncertain
Year of death unknown
13th-century Indian Muslims